Air Supply is the eighth studio and second eponymous album by British-Australian soft rock duo Air Supply, released in 1985. The album was a step down in the band's sales, reaching gold certification and No. 26 on the US charts.  The single "Just as I Am" was their last major entry on the charts, reaching No. 19 on the Billboard Hot 100, while their interpretation of the Jennifer Rush song "The Power of Love" became a minor hit, reaching No. 68.

Track listing 
 "Just as I Am"  (Rob Hegel, Dick Wagner) – 4:46
 "The Power of Love"  (Gunther Mende, Candy DeRouge, Jennifer Rush, Mary Susan Applegate) – 5:22
 "I Can't Let Go"  (Graham Russell, Billy Steinberg) – 4:10
 "After All" (Seth Swirsky) – 3:40
 "I Wanna Hold You Tonight" (Russell, Don Cromwell, Ken Rarick) –  3:45
 "Make It Right" (Russell, Cromwell, Rarick) – 3:48
 "When the Time Is Right" (Gerald Milne) – 4:51
 "Sandy" (Bruce Springsteen) – 4:17
 "Great Pioneer" (Russell, Milne) – 4:11
 "Black and Blue" (Russell, Steinberg, Cromwell, Rarick) – 3:58
 "Sunset" (Russell) –  2:49
 "Never Fade Away" (Russell) –  4:40

Personnel 
Air Supply
 Russell Hitchcock – vocals
 Graham Russell – vocals, guitars
 Wally Stocker – guitars
 Frank Esler-Smith – keyboards, string arrangements 
 Ken Rarick – keyboards
 Andy Richards – keyboard programming, synthesizer programming 
 Don Cromwell – bass
 Ralph Cooper – drums

Additional musicians
 Bob Ezrin – keyboards
 George Doering – guitars
 Grant Geissman – guitars 
 Tim Thorney – guitars 
 Dick Wagner – guitars
 Howard Ayee – bass, backing vocals 
 Tim Ryan – bass
 Ken Sinnaeve – bass
 Jorn Anderson – drums
 Gary Craig – drums, percussion 
 Charlie Morgan – drums, percussion 
 Del Blake – percussion 
 Marc Russo – saxophones
 Larry Williams – saxophones
 Gary Grant – trumpet 
 Jerry Hey – trumpet 
 Maxi Anderson – backing vocals 
 Joel Feeney – backing vocals 
 Chrissie Hammond – backing vocals 
 Lindsay Hammond – backing vocals 
 Rachel Oldfield – backing vocals 
 Phyllis St. James – backing vocals 
 Tata Vega – backing vocals

Production 
 Bob Ezrin – producer (1, 4, 7, 8, 9, 11)
 Peter Collins – producer (2, 3, 5, 6, 10, 12)
 Mark Weiss – photography 
 David Arden – management 
 Don Arden – management 
 Jet Management – management company

Charts

References 

1985 albums
Air Supply albums
Albums produced by Bob Ezrin
Albums produced by Peter Collins (record producer)
Arista Records albums